The Trenton Ferry Historic District is a historic mixed-use urban working class neighborhood primarily composed of modest row houses, schools, churches, and commercial buildings.  The neighborhood has roots in the 18th century but the majority of its fabric dates to the 19th and early 20th centuries.  The district has few modern intrusions and has retained its historic character. The district was added to the National Register of Historic Places on June 26, 2013. It includes 581 contributing buildings and three contributing sites.

See also
National Register of Historic Places listings in Mercer County, New Jersey

References

Historic districts in Mercer County, New Jersey
National Register of Historic Places in Trenton, New Jersey
Trenton, New Jersey
Historic districts on the National Register of Historic Places in New Jersey
New Jersey Register of Historic Places
Working-class culture in New Jersey